Switzerland women's national sevens team represents Switzerland in women's Rugby sevens.

Tournament History 
Switzerland participated in an invitational tournament that was held alongside the 2014 Netherlands Women's Sevens which was the last leg for the 2013–14 Women's Sevens World Series.

Players 
Performance Squad:

(c) Casparis, Carole (RC Falcons)
Andrey, Kim (RC Nyon)
Barry, Oumou (RC Luzern)
Bosshard, Rahel (GC Zurich)
Damachi, Lami (RC CMSG)
Fontana, Géraldine (GC Zurich)
Fux, Selina (RC Luzern)
Gardeta Valez, Claudia (RC Albaladéjo)
Gerber, Nicole (RC CMSG)
Haymoz, Simone (GC Zurich)
Mani, Ramona (RC Bern)
Pagnot, Claire (CRIG)
Testenière, Laure (RC Bern)
Thiébaud, Anne (RC Albaladéjo)
Ullmann, Fabienne (RC Bern)

Development Squad

Cegla, Heather (RC CMSG)
Gaudin, Julie (RC Albaladéjo)
Gerber, Nina (RC Bern)
Iachizzi, Monica (GC Zurich)
Luzi, Julie (RC Haute-Broye)
Robert, Léonie (CRIG)
Saur, Anna (GC Zurich)
Willmann, Sina (RC Luzern)
Wu, Ka Ling (RC Albaladéjo)

Future (U18)

Eichler, Johanna (GC Zurich)
Hauser, Amélie (RC Chaux-de-Fonds)
Zellweger, Joanne (TV Thun)
Zumbrunnen, Nathanja (RC Bern)

References

<http://www.suisserugby.com/>

External links
 Swiss Rugby Home

Women's national rugby sevens teams
Rugby union in Switzerland